Philip Joseph (born 10 January 1985) is a former Wales international rugby league footballer.

Background
Phil Joseph was born in Huddersfield, West Yorkshire, England.

Bradford
After being on trial for several months Joseph earned himself a one-year deal at Super League club Bradford Bulls.

Joseph featured in three of the four pre-season friendlies. He played against Castleford, Dewsbury and Hull F.C. Phil scored a try against Dewsbury.

Joseph made his début in Round 3 (Wigan). He also featured in two consecutive games from Round 4 (Wakefield Trinity) to Round 5 (Warrington). He featured in two consecutive games from Round 9 (Hull F.C.) to Round 10 (Leeds). He was injured for Rounds 11-22 and Rounds 4-5 of the Challenge Cup. Joseph played in Round 27 (Catalans Dragons).

He was released at the end of the season.

Widnes

2013
Joseph featured in the Boxing Day friendly against Warrington he started at hooker in the 30-22 loss.

He featured in two consecutive games from Round 1 (London Broncos) to Round 2 (St. Helens). He next appeared in Round 6 (Bradford Bulls) and then Round 8 (Wigan). He played in Round 10 (Huddersfield) and Round 12 (Castleford) to Round 17 (Catalans Dragons). Joseph played in Round 19 (Bradford Bulls) to Round 21 (Wakefield Trinity). Then again in Round 23 (Hull F.C.) to Round 27 (Salford). He also featured in the Challenge Cup against Doncaster, Workington Town and Wigan. He scored against Wakefield Trinity (1 try).

2014

Joseph featured in Round 1 (London Broncos) to Round 3 (Salford). He also featured in Round 6 (Hull F.C.) to Round 8 (Catalans Dragons). Then in Round 13 (Salford).

On 30 April 2014, Phil signed a new 2-year deal to stay with Widnes.

Statistics

International honours
Phil Joseph won caps for Wales while at Hull Kingston Rovers and Halifax 2005-07 - 7 (6?)-caps 1-try 4-points.

In October 2015, Phil played for Wales in the 2015 European Cup.

In October 2016, Phil played for Wales in the 2017 World Cup qualifiers.

References

External links
Bradford give deal to ex-Huddersfield prop Phil Joseph
Search for "Phil Joseph" AND "Rugby League" at BBC – Sport
Swinton Lions rugby pro Phil Joseph won't give up the night job in Huddersfield bar 1/2
Swinton Lions rugby pro Phil Joseph won't give up the night job in Huddersfield bar 2/2
(archived by web.archive.org) Statistics at rlwc2017.com

1985 births
Living people
Black British sportsmen
Bradford Bulls players
English rugby league players
Halifax R.L.F.C. players
Huddersfield Giants players
Hull Kingston Rovers players
Oldham R.L.F.C. players
Rugby league players from Huddersfield
Rugby league hookers
Rugby league locks
Rugby league props
Rugby league second-rows
Salford Red Devils players
Swinton Lions players
Wales national rugby league team players
Whitehaven R.L.F.C. players
Widnes Vikings players
Workington Town players